is a railway station on the Ōu Main Line in the city of Nanyō, Yamagata Prefecture, Japan, operated by East Japan Railway Company (JR East).

Lines
Nakagawa Station is served by the Ōu Main Line, and is located 64.4 rail kilometers from the terminus of the line at Fukushima Station.

Station layout
Nakagawa Station has two opposed side platforms connected via a pedestrian overpass; however, only one platform is in use. The station is unattended.

Platforms

History
Nakagawa Station opened on November 3, 1903. The station was absorbed into the JR East network upon the privatization of JNR on 1 April 1987.

Surrounding area
  National Route 13

External links

 JR East Station information 

Stations of East Japan Railway Company
Railway stations in Yamagata Prefecture
Ōu Main Line
Railway stations in Japan opened in 1903